Birds of Prey: The Album is the soundtrack album by various artists for the film Birds of Prey, released by Atlantic Records on February 7, 2020. Atlantic released five singles leading up to the album's release day. The album debuted at number 23 on the US Billboard 200, number nine in Australia, and within the top 40 in Canada, New Zealand, and Switzerland. It won the 2020 American Music Award for Top Soundtrack. A separate film score album, titled Birds of Prey (and the Fantabulous Emancipation of One Harley Quinn) – Original Motion Picture Score and composed by Daniel Pemberton, was released on February 14 by WaterTower Music.

Background and development 
Described as the "candy-colored, R-rated new entry in the DC Extended Universe", Birds of Prey, the film honored a classic superhero movie tradition as seen with the Suicide Squad soundtrack for the 2016 film, Suicide Squad. The album features songs by various female artists, including Megan Thee Stallion, Halsey, Saweetie, Doja Cat, Normani, and Summer Walker.  The director of the film, Cathy Yan, stated that music is a super important concept in film and that it "motivates [her]". She went on the say that "it kind of helps me create the characters". Yan and the production team worked closely with Atlantic Records to assemble a "sort of musical girl gang", and create an all-female soundtrack for this women-powered world.

Kevin Weaver, president of the Atlantic Records West Coast of the soundtrack, went on to say he "was looking for a female, badass sensibility to tie directly back to Harley Quinn and the Birds of Prey characters" and he "wanted to mirror Harley's journey with a music sensibility that kind of spoke to those same themes and through-lines".

Music and lyrics
The genres of the album have been described by Crimson staff writer, Annie Harrigan, as hip hop, pop, alternative rock and rap. Songs like "Boss Bitch", "So Thick" and "Diamonds" include uplifting lyrics and embody themes like "self-sufficiency, hard work, and confidence". "Experiment on Me" has "heavy guitar, a steady beat, and screamo-style vocals", while "Danger" is "one of the more hardcore tracks", featuring "strong beats, echoey and screamo vocals, and strong hip-hop and rock influences".

The album also included covers of the songs "It's a Man's Man's Man's World" by James Brown, "I'm Gonna Love You Just a Little More Baby" by Barry White, and "Hit Me with Your Best Shot" by Pat Benatar.

Singles
The album's first single, "Diamonds" by Megan Thee Stallion and Normani, was released on January 10, 2020, with a music video inspired by Harley Quinn. The second single, "Joke's On You" by Charlotte Lawrence, was released on January 17. The third single, "Boss Bitch" by Doja Cat, was released January 24 with a music video. The fourth single was "Sway with Me" by Saweetie and Galxara, with a music video featuring Ella Jay Basco reprising her role as Cassandra Cain from the film, and was released on January 31. The fifth single, "Experiment On Me" by Halsey, was released on February 7, alongside the album's release. A solo version of "Sway with Me" by Galxara was released as a standalone single on May 1.

Commercial performance
The album debuted at number 23 on the Billboard 200 chart, and was the week's fifth best-selling album. "Boss Bitch" by Doja Cat was the only single from the album to chart on the Billboard Hot 100 at number 100. "Diamonds" by Megan Thee Stallion and Normani peaked at number 16 on the Bubbling Under Hot 100 but missed the mainstream chart.

Critical reception

The soundtrack was met with positive reviews. Variety regarded it as "one incredible needle drop after incredible needle drop, bursting with the energy, freedom and sometimes chaotic sounds reflected in [the film]". The use of only female artists was praised by Crimson, who noted that they "exhibit a broad range of musical genres and styles" and "despite drastic differences amid the artists", the songs "flow perfectly into the next in terms of style, genre, and lyrical content". AllMusic wrote, "while the album whips around genres at breakneck speed, everything fits together nicely", commending the "blend of energy, menace, and danger from a team of badass women". Clash praised the soundtrack, calling it an "incredible sonic companion to the [film], both of which show the world the power of an all-female roster, exploding with creative dexterity".

Tracklist

Personnel

 Manny Marroquin – mixing 
 Jaycen Joshua – mixing 
 Phil Tan – mixing 
 Serban Ghenea – mixing 
 Ike Schultz – mixing 
 Jon Hume – mixing, backing vocals, guitar, piano 
 Cyrus "NOIS" Taghipour – mixing 
 Derek "MixedByAli" Ali – mixing 
 Jeff Braun – mixing 
 John Hanes – mix engineering 
 Jaime P. Velez – engineering , vocal production 
 Michelle Mancini – mastering 
 Colin Leonard – mastering 
 Dave Kutch – mastering 
 Joe Lambert – mastering 
 Imad Royal – programming 
 Sky Adams – programming 
 Whipped Cream – programming 
 MD$ – programming 
 Louis Bell – programming 
 Mike Arrow – programming 
 Jacob Ubizz – programming 
 Cutfather – programming 
 Daniel Pemberton – programming 
 Two Inch Punch – programming 
 Matias Mora – programming 
 Oliver Sykes – programming 
 Jordan Fish – programming 
 David Dahlquist – programming 
 Patrick Morrissey – programming 
 David Pramik – programming 
 Ojivolta – programming 
 Andrew Orkin – programming 
 London on da Track – programming 
 Matt Bronleewe – programming 
 Dustin Wise – programming 
 Marie Hines – programming 
 Ashley Jacobson – vocal engineering 
 Avena Savage – vocal engineering, vocal production 
 Josiah Bell – vocal production 
 Kuk Harrell – vocal production 
 Zachary Acosta – engineering assistant 
 Curtis "Sircut" Bye – engineering assistant 
 Mike Seaberg – mixing assistant 
 DJ Riggins – mixing assistant 
 Jacob Richards – mixing assistant

Charts

Weekly charts

Year-end charts

Birds of Prey (and the Fantabulous Emancipation of One Harley Quinn) – Original Motion Picture Score

The separate film score titled Birds of Prey (and the Fantabulous Emancipation of One Harley Quinn) – Original Motion Picture Score composed by Daniel Pemberton was released on February 14, 2020, by WaterTower Music.

Track listing

See also
List of 2020 albums

References

2020 soundtrack albums
2020s film soundtrack albums
Atlantic Records soundtracks
Birds of Prey
DC Extended Universe soundtracks
Harley Quinn in other media
Superhero film soundtracks
Albums produced by Two Inch Punch